Kroy Evan Biermann (born September 12, 1985) is a former American football outside linebacker. He was drafted by the Atlanta Falcons in the fifth round of the 2008 NFL Draft. He played college football at Montana. He is married to former Bravo television personality Kim Zolciak.

Early years
Biermann was born in Hardin, Montana, the son of Keith and Kathy Biermann. He has two older sisters, Krista and Kelsey. His parents and immediate family all have names that start with the letter "K." Wanting to keep the tradition going and unhappy with standard names beginning with "K", Biermann's mother searched a phone book for a suitable "K" name and chose Kroy.

Biermann earned eight letters at Hardin High School (Hardin, Montana): three in football; three in wrestling; and two in track. He was a First-team All-State pick and team captain as a junior and senior at linebacker. He was chosen First-team All-Conference at running back in 2002 and 2003. He participated in Montana's Annual East-West Shrine Game.  Biermann was also one of the state's premier wrestlers at the A level and placed second in the state as a junior and senior. His senior year in wrestling he was team captain, had the most take-downs and most pins, and was voted his team's Most Valuable Wrestler.

College career
Biermann played in 52 career games while totaling 220 tackles, 32 sacks (second-most in school history), 45 tackles for loss, nine forced fumbles, and seven fumble recoveries for the University of Montana. 
In 2004, as a true freshman, Biermann played in 14 of 15 games and had seven tackles for a loss.

During the 2005 season, he played in all 12 games and was the team's fifth-leading tackler and was third on the team with seven sacks  and tied for a team-high two fumble recoveries. In 2006, he made 78 stops and contributed with 11 sacks and 13.5 tackles for loss in 14 games. Named a Walter Camp First-team Small College All-American, he was voted a Second-team Little All-America selection by both the Associated Press and The Sports Network. He also earned First-team All-Big Sky Conference. 

Biermann was named the 2007 Big Sky Conference Defensive MVP after accumulating 70 tackles, 15 sacks, 18 tackles for a loss, and five forced fumbles during his senior season. Biermann became Montana's first-ever recipient of the Buck Buchanan Award in 2007, as well, given annually by The Sports Network to the top defensive player in Division I Football Championship Subdivision. He played outside linebacker in the 2008 Hula Bowl.

Professional career
Biermann was a top performer in the vertical jump and in the 3-cone drill at the 2008 NFL Combine.

Atlanta Falcons
Biermann was selected by the Atlanta Falcons in the 5th round of the 2008 NFL Draft (154 overall). Biermann posted his first career sack in a Week 13 match-up against the San Diego Chargers after tackling Chargers QB Philip Rivers and added a second in the season finale against the St. Louis Rams. He also contributed 14 tackles in 2008. 

Biermann started off the 2009 season fast for the Falcons as he sacked Dolphins' QB Chad Pennington twice, forced a fumble and forced a holding call in the season opener. He also got a sack vs San Francisco in the Falcon's week 5 matchup. He now has a career-high 3 sacks and one 2 sack game (career high). He took the starting left defensive end spot from 2007 first round pick Jamaal Anderson after his performance vs San Francisco. 

Biermann scored his first NFL touchdown on November 2, 2009 in a Monday night game at the New Orleans Saints. He returned a Drew Brees fumble five yards for the score. On December 27, 2009, Biermann stepped in as the team's placekicker after an injury to the punter Michael Koenen during a game against the Buffalo Bills. Biermann, who had not kicked since high school, had  kickoffs of 67, 58 and 54 yards. On October 10, 2010, he made headlines as he tipped a Jake Delhomme pass to himself for an interception and returned it 41 yards for a touchdown.

On September 15, 2013, he suffered a torn tendon and missed the rest of the 2013 regular season.

On March 20, 2015, the Atlanta Falcons offered Biermann a new contract after spending a week on the free agent list and after recovering from Achilles tendon surgery and leading the Falcons defense with 4.5 sacks during the 2014 season. He signed a one-year, $1,925,000 contract, including a $500,000 signing bonus and $500,000 guaranteed. He finished the 2015 season with 55 tackles, 2.5 sacks, and one forced fumble.

Buffalo Bills
Biermann signed a one-year deal with the Bills on August 15, 2016.

On September 2, 2016, the Bills released Biermann as part of final roster cuts.

Personal life
In May 2010, Biermann participated in a Dancing Stars Of Atlanta charity event, at which he met Kim Zolciak, to raise money for Alzheimer's disease.  Their meeting was later shown on season three of The Real Housewives of Atlanta. Their son, Kroy Jagger (KJ), was born on May 31, 2011. The couple wed at their Roswell, Georgia home  on November 11, 2011. Zolciak became pregnant again and son Kash Kade was born on August 15, 2012. On November 25, 2013, their twins Kaia Rose and Kane Ren were born. In March 2013, Biermann filed to legally adopt Zolciak's daughters, Brielle and Ariana, from her previous relationships. When the adoption became final in July 2013, the girls changed their last names to Biermann.

References

External links

1985 births
Living people
American football defensive ends
American football linebackers
Atlanta Falcons players
Buffalo Bills players
Montana Grizzlies football players
People from Hardin, Montana
Players of American football from Montana